Mike Eischeid is a former professional American football punter with a 9-year career in the American Football League and the National Football League from 1966 to 1974.

Career
Eischeid was the regular punter for the Oakland Raiders from 1966 to 1970, but played in only 2 games in 1971. He was also their regular place kicker in 1966, but only made 11 out of 26 field goals for a 42.3% average, and was replaced the following year by George Blanda. In particular, he punted on the 1967 AFL Champion Raiders and in the second AFL-NFL World Championship Game (Super Bowl II), which the Raiders lost. 

He reached his peak average in 1967 with 44.3 yards per punt, second in the AFL, a total that Ray Guy (future punter for the Raiders and eventual inductee into the Pro Football Hall of Fame) surpassed only once in 14 years, but Eischeid's average steadily declined from 1968 to 1970, until he was replaced by Jerry DePoyster in 1971. Then he became the regular punter of the Minnesota Vikings from 1972 to 1974, playing in Super Bowl VIII and Super Bowl IX for the Vikings, both losses. In three Super Bowls, his team lost each time. In AFL and NFC championship games, his teams won 3 (1967, 1973, 1974) and lost one (1969). He holds the record for most career punts in Super Bowls with 17 total punts in 3 games.

See also
Other American Football League players

External links
Eischeid at football reference
Raider starters
Super Bowl Records

1940 births
Living people
Upper Iowa Peacocks football players
People from Orange City, Iowa
Players of American football from Iowa
American football punters
Oakland Raiders players
Minnesota Vikings players
American Football League players